Peter of Urgell may refer to:
Peter I of Urgell (died 1258)
Peter II of Urgell (died 1408)